Goshta Eka Paithanichi is a 2022 Marathi-language film directed by Shantanu Ganesh Rode, produced by Akshay Bardapurkar, Abhayanand Singh, and Piiyush Singh under the banner of Planet Marathi Production, Golden Ratio Films, and Lakeside Productions. The film starring Sayali Sanjeev, Suvrat Joshi, Milind Gunaji and Mrinal Kulkarni.

The film won the National Film Award for Best Feature Film in Marathi at India's 68th National Film Awards.

Cast
Sayali Sanjeev as Indrayani
Suvrat Joshi as Sujit
Aarav Shetye as Shree
Mrinal Kulkarni as Smitatai
Mohan Joshi as Karandikar
Milind Gunaji as Inamdar
Shashank Ketkar as Subodh
Aditi Dravid as Meena
Prajakta Hanamghar as Chanda
Madhura Velankar Satam as Akkasaheb
Girija Oak Godbole as Sheela
Savita Malpekar as Aaji
Suhita Thatte as Mai
Jaywant Wadkar as Driver
Sunil Holkar as Ashok
Ganesh Yadav as Thief
Poornima Ahire Kende 
Nidhi Rasane as Pinki

Production 
Principal photography began on 24 November 2019 at Mumbai. Filming also took place at Pune and Bhor. Principal photography wrapped up in February 2020. A official teaser of the film was released on 11 May 2020.

Soundtrack

Release 
The film was released on 2 December 2022.

Accolades

References

External links

Upcoming films
2020s Marathi-language films
Indian drama films